Herman Vedel (1 March 1875 – 1 December 1948) was a Danish painter. He was the leading Danish portraitist of his time. One of his most well-known works is Negotiating the 1915 Constitution which features prominently in Christiansborg Palace.

Biography
Herman Albert Gude  Vedel was born  in Copenhagen, Denmark. 
He attended the Copenhagen Technical College where he trained under Henrik Grønvold (1858–1940). He was educated at the Royal Danish Academy of Fine Arts from 1894 to 1897. He earned his  cand. phil. in 1893. He also attended the art school  Kunstnernes Frie Studieskoler from 1896 to 1899.

After his debut at Charlottenborg with "Portrait of a young girl" in 1900 (Danish National Gallery), he quickly became a sought after portraitist.

Wedel specialized in portrait painting from an early age. He painted a vast number of prominent figures of his time, including, critic and scholar 
Georg Brandes, Nobel Prize-winning author Johannes V. Jensen and polar explorer Knud Rasmussen. He also painted a group portrait  Negotiating the 1915 Constitution.

Awards
 Eckersberg Medal (1909)
 Thorvaldsen Medal (1918)

Gallery

See also
 Art of Denmark

References

Rxternal links

 Herman Vedel at Kunstindeks Danmark

Danish portrait painters
20th-century Danish painters
Danish male painters
Royal Danish Academy of Fine Arts alumni
1875 births
1948 deaths
Recipients of the Thorvaldsen Medal
Recipients of the Eckersberg Medal
20th-century Danish male artists